Princess Fukang, (1038 –1070) was a princess of the Song Dynasty. She was the eldest daughter of Emperor Renzong of Song.

Background
Princess Fukang got her title in 1038, shortly after she was born. In 1056, she married Li Wei, her first cousin once removed, who had a similar age as her. Li Wei was the son of Renzong’s uncle. The marriage happened because Renzong’s mother, Consort Li, died early, and he wanted to have more connections with his mother’s family. However, Princess Fukang did not have a happy marriage. Both Li Wei and his mother did not like her. They divorced shortly, and were forced to married again. Princess Fukang died in 1078, and her posthumous name is Zhuangxiao (庄孝), which means wide and filial.

In popular culture
In the television series Serenade of Peaceful Joy, Princess Fukang had the name Zhao Huirou, and was played by
five actors.

Adult: Ren Min (任敏)/
Teenager: He Sitian (何思甜)/
Pre-teen：Ren Feier (任飞儿)/
Child: Zheng Yuyi (张毓宜)/
Toddler: Su Yike (苏伊可）

References

Song dynasty people
1038 births
1070 deaths
Ancient Chinese princesses
Daughters of emperors